Charles Meredith (August 27, 1894 – November 28, 1964) was an American film and television actor.

Biography 

Meredith was born in Knoxville, Pennsylvania. He was a popular silent film leading man and played opposite such actresses as Blanche Sweet, Mary Miles Minter, Florence Vidor, and others in romantic drama and comedy films. In 1924, he left his film career for work on the stage. He returned to film in 1947 where he played a number of small character roles. Toward the end of his career, he turned to television as well, notably as Secretary Drake in the Rocky Jones, Space Ranger (1954) series. He also appeared in three episodes of The Lone Ranger, each time as a doctor, including the "Cannonball McKay" (1949) episode (1/16) as Doc Tate.

He died, aged 70 in 1964, in Los Angeles, California.

Partial filmography

 The Other Half (1919) - Donald Trent
 Poor Relations (1919) - Monty Rhodes
 Luck in Pawn (1919) - Richard Standish Norton
 The Thirteenth Commandment (1920) - Clay Wimborn
 Judy of Rogue's Harbor (1920) - Lt. Teddy Kingsland
 The Family Honor (1920) - Merle Curran
 That Something (1920) - Edwin Drake
 Simple Souls (1920) - Duke of Wynninghame
 The Ladder of Lies (1920) - John Blaine
 The Perfect Woman (1920) - James Stanhope
 A Romantic Adventuress (1920) - Capt. Maxwell
 The Little 'Fraid Lady (1920) - Saxton Graves
 The Foolish Matrons (1921) - Lafayette Wayne
 Beyond (1921) - Geoffrey Southerne
 Hail the Woman (1921) - Richard Stuart
 The Cave Girl (1921) - Diivvy Bates
 The Cradle (1922) - Dr. Robeert Harveey
 Woman, Wake Up (1922) - Henry Mortimer
 In Hollywood with Potash and Perlmutter (1924)  - Sam Pemberton
 Daisy Kenyon (1947) - Judge (uncredited)
 The Miracle of the Bells (1948) - Father Spinsky
 All My Sons (1948) - Ellsworth (uncredited)
 Homecoming (1948) - Major on Return Transport Ship (uncredited)
 Dream Girl (1948) - Charles
 A Foreign Affair (1948) - Congressman Yandell
 They Live by Night (1948) - Comm. Hubbell
 For the Love of Mary (1948) - Justice Hastings
 The Boy with Green Hair (1948) - Mr. Piper
 He Walked by Night (1948) - Hollywood Police Official (uncredited)
 The Lucky Stiff (1949) - Jim Childers aka Big Jim
 Tulsa (1949) - Ned - Governor of Oklahoma (uncredited)
 Streets of San Francisco (1949) - James T. Eckert - Chief of Police
 Tokyo Joe (1949) - General Ireton
 Always Leave Them Laughing (1949) - Dr. Finley (uncredited)
 The Lady Takes a Sailor (1949) - Dr. Rufus McKewen (uncredited)
 Samson and Delilah (1949) - High Priest of Dagon (uncredited)
 Malaya (1949) - Big Man (uncredited)
 Francis (1950) - Banker Munroe
 Perfect Strangers (1950) - Lyle Pettijohn
 Caged (1950) - Parole Board Chairman (uncredited)
 Bright Leaf (1950) - Pendleton (uncredited)
 Kiss Tomorrow Goodbye (1950) - Fred Golightly, Attorney (uncredited)
 The Sun Sets at Dawn (1950) - Reporter, AP
 Counterspy Meets Scotland Yard (1950) - Miller
 Al Jennings of Oklahoma (1951) - Judge Evans
 The Great Missouri Raid (1951) - Member Bankers Association (uncredited)
 Santa Fe (1951) - Official in Santa Fe (uncredited)
 Along the Great Divide (1951) - Judge Marlowe
 Dear Brat (1951) - Speaker (uncredited)
 Strangers on a Train (1951) - Judge Donahue (uncredited)
 Fort Worth (1951) - Sam, Railroad Backer (uncredited)
 Close to My Heart (1951) - Dr. George E. Williamson (uncredited)
 The Sea Hornet (1951) - Mr. Goodrich (uncredited)
 Submarine Command (1951) - Adm. Tobias
 Room for One More (1952) - Mr. Thatcher (uncredited)
 The Big Trees (1952) - Elder Bixby
 Loan Shark (1952) - F.L. Rennick (uncredited)
 Paula (1952) - Dr. Walter T. Farrell (uncredited)
 Cattle Town (1952) - Texas Governor
 So This Is Love (1953) - Arthur Bodansky (uncredited)
 A Lion Is in the Streets (1953) - Judge (uncredited)
 Them! (1954) - Washington Official (uncredited)
 Rocky Jones, Space Ranger (1954, TV Series, 23 episodes) - Secretary of Space Drake
 New York Confidential (1955) - Congressman (uncredited)
 The Eternal Sea (1955) - Vice Admiral (uncredited)
 City of Shadows (1955) - Judge Fellows (uncredited)
 The Road to Denver (1955) - Lawyer Krump (uncredited)
 Illegal (1955) - Judge (uncredited)
 The Lone Ranger (1956) - Governor
 Miracle in the Rain (1956) - Mr. Baldwin's Associate (uncredited)
 The Birds and the Bees (1956) - Passenger (uncredited)
 Back from Eternity (1956) - Dean Simmons (uncredited)
 Giant (1956) - Minister (uncredited)
 Top Secret Affair (1957) - Charlie (uncredited)
 The Guns of Fort Petticoat (1957) - Commanding Officer (uncredited)
 Beau James (1957) - Judge John Harrison (uncredited)
 Chicago Confidential (1957) - Dr. Charing - Sound Expert (uncredited)
 The Court of Last Resort (1957-1958, TV Series) - Dr. LeMoyne Snyder
 The Buccaneer (1958) - Senior Senator
 Twelve Hours to Kill (1960) - Herbst - the Druggist
 Noose for a Gunman (1960) - Minister (uncredited)
 Ocean's Eleven (1960) - Mr. Cohen - Mortician (uncredited)
 A Public Affair (1962) - Sen. Lewis (uncredited)
 The Incredible Mr. Limpet (1964) - Fleet Admiral
 Seven Days in May (1964) - Senate Committee Member (uncredited)
 Dead Ringer (1964) - Defense Lawyer (uncredited)
 The Quick Gun (1964) - Rev. Staley (final film role)

External links

1894 births
1964 deaths
Male actors from Pennsylvania
American male film actors
American male silent film actors
American male television actors
20th-century American male actors
People from Tioga County, Pennsylvania